Ukraine competed at the 2015 World Aquatics Championships in Kazan, Russia from 24 July to 9 August 2015.

Medalists

4th rankings
Ukraine was the team which achieved the 4th place the most among others (including the 5th position where were two bronze medalists):

Diving

Ukrainian divers qualified for the individual spots and the synchronized teams at the World Championships.

Men

Women

Mixed

High diving

Ukraine has qualified two high divers to compete at the World Championships.

Open water swimming

Ukraine has qualified two open water swimmers to compete in each of the following events.

Swimming

Ukrainian swimmers have achieved qualifying standards in the following events (up to a maximum of 2 swimmers in each event at the A-standard entry time, and 1 at the B-standard):

Men

Women

Synchronized swimming

Ukraine fielded a full squad of twelve synchronized swimmers (one male and eleven female) to compete in each of the following events.

Women

Mixed

References

External links
Ukraine Swimming Federation 

Nations at the 2015 World Aquatics Championships
2015 in Ukrainian sport
Ukraine at the World Aquatics Championships